John Henry Mills (born October 31, 1969 in Jacksonville, Florida) is a former American football running back, linebacker and tight end in the NFL for the Houston Oilers, Oakland Raiders and the Minnesota Vikings. Mills was selected to the Pro Bowl after the 1996 season as a special teams captain. He played college football at Wake Forest University where he was an Alpha Sigma Phi. Mills is currently an outside linebacker coach for Clear Lake High School, in Houston, Texas. John Henry Mills was a four-year letterman at tight end under head coach Bill Dooley. Mills is Wake's all-time leading receiver among tight ends with 142 receptions for 1,652 yards. A three-time All-ACC first-team selection from 1990 through 1992, he finished third in the ACC in receptions in 1990 with 46 and led the league in 1991 with 51. Against Duke in 1990, he caught 12 passes for 230 yards, still the second-most receiving yards in a game in school history. Mills is also announced in the 2008 ACC Football Championship Game Legends Class. A fifth-round pick of the Houston Oilers in the 1993 NFL Draft, Mills played seven seasons in the NFL with Houston, Oakland and Minnesota. In 1996, while with the Oilers, he earned All-Pro honors as a special teams player.

References

1969 births
Living people
American football running backs
American football tight ends
American football linebackers
Wake Forest Demon Deacons football players
Houston Oilers players
Oakland Raiders players
Minnesota Vikings players
American Conference Pro Bowl players